Five ships of the United States Navy have borne the name USS Fulton, in honor of Robert Fulton.

United States floating battery Demologos, later Fulton, a catamaran steam frigate, launched in 1815, delivered to the Navy in 1816 and used as a receiving ship until she exploded in 1829
, a sidewheel steamer launched in 1837, captured by the Confederates in 1861 and destroyed in the evacuation of Pensacola in 1862
, a submarine tender launched in 1914, reclassified as a gunboat (PG-49) in 1930, and decommissioned in 1934
, a tugboat, converted into a patrol vessel in commission from 1917 to 1919

See also

, a sternwheel steamer in service as a tender with the United States Army′s Ram Fleet from 1862 to ca. 1864
Fulton (ship), for other ships of this name

United States Navy ship names